Lillian Perryman Houston (born September 9, 1942) is an American politician from Georgia. Houston is a former Democratic member and current Republican member of the Georgia House of Representatives since 1997.

References

External links 
 Penny Houston at ballotpedia.org

1942 births
Living people
Members of the Georgia House of Representatives
Georgia (U.S. state) Democrats
Georgia (U.S. state) Republicans
21st-century American politicians
21st-century American women politicians
20th-century American politicians
20th-century American women politicians
Women state legislators in Georgia (U.S. state)